"Heart Don't Fall Now" is a song written by Carolyn Swilley, Bill LaBounty and Beckie Foster, and recorded by American country music group Sawyer Brown.  It was released in February 1986 as the second single from the album Shakin'.  The song reached #14 on the Billboard Hot Country Singles & Tracks chart.

Chart performance

References

1986 singles
1985 songs
Sawyer Brown songs
Songs written by Bill LaBounty
Capitol Records Nashville singles
Curb Records singles
Songs written by Beckie Foster